Pace Academy is a K–12 college preparatory private school, located at 966 West Paces Ferry Road in the Buckhead area of Atlanta, Georgia, United States. Pace has approximately 1,115 students.

History

Pace Academy was founded in Atlanta in 1959 in response to the successful challenge of Atlanta Public Schools' segregationist policies in federal court. Pace Academy was founded as a de facto all-white school and was among the private schools attended by white children whose parents did not want them going to public schools with African-Americans.  Although the school is not affiliated with a specific church or religion, it adheres to Judeo-Christian values and places a major emphasis on character development. 
 
Pace Academy is situated on 37 acres in Atlanta's Buckhead neighborhood. The school's main building, the Castle, was constructed as a private house in 1932 for the Ogden family. Pace Academy was incorporated on June 30, 1958, with an initial enrollment of 178 students, for the purpose of “training and educating children and operating a school and kindergarten.” Frank Kaley was hired as Pace's first headmaster in 1959. 
 
In 1964, Pace graduated its first class, with 13 students receiving diplomas. Further improvements to Pace’s athletic facilities were made in 1966 when the school constructed a gymnasium and enlarged the athletic field. This facility was dedicated to the memory of William T. Boyd, who had been president of the Pace Parents Club. In 1971, Bridges Hall was constructed and named in honor of Russell Bridges, who had served as chairman of Pace’s Board of Trustees for 10 years. It housed the Lower School, some Upper School classrooms and the present library. 

Pace accepted its first African-American student, a kindergartener, in 1966.
 
In 1972, George G. Kirkpatrick assumed leadership of the school. Although from its incorporation, Pace was accredited by the Georgia Accreditation Committee for its educational programs, 1973 saw the accreditation of Pace by the Southern Association of Colleges and Schools. In 1976 the Randall property adjacent to Pace became available and a fundraising drive was launched to purchase the property.
 
Peter Cobb became headmaster in 1994, the same year the Castle was officially named Kirkpatrick Hall, in honor of George G. Kirkpatrick, who had led Pace through its greatest growth. 

Following Cobb's resignation in 1996, Michael A. Murphy, who had served as head of Lower School for seven years, served as Interim Headmaster until February 1997 when he was named Headmaster. 
In spring 1997, following a gift of $2 million by the Hugh M. Inman Foundation, the Educating for Life – Pace 2000 capital campaign was launched, with a goal of $16 million. During Murphy's tenure, Pace embarked on a campaign to build a new Middle School building. 

In fall 2005 the fifth Head of School was appointed, Fred Assaf. In 2007 the school resolved longstanding issues with the neighborhood association and entered into an agreement which preserved the small size of Pace whilst expanding the facilities to accommodate a moderate increase in enrollment. As a part of this plan, Pace realized its need to acquire expanded athletic facilities and acquired two parcels, an eight-acre baseball/softball complex on Warren Road and a 23-acre tract on Riverview Road in Cobb County, which now has a stadium for soccer, lacrosse, and football with seating for 2000, a track & field facility, an additional soccer/lacrosse/football field, a baseball field and stadium, and a softball field and stadium. Development of the softball field and the renovation of the baseball field were funded by the sale of the Warren Road complex to The Galloway School in 2016. 
 
During summer 2012, Pace Academy launched a new capital campaign with a purpose of building a new high school. The campaign's lead donor was Arthur Blank, who was both the owner of the Atlanta Falcons and a Pace parent. The Arthur M. Blank Family Upper School officially opened on August 18, 2014.

Awards and recognition
During the 2004–05 school year, Pace Academy was recognized with the Blue Ribbon School Award of Excellence by the United States Department of Education.

School programs
Pace Academy also has a robotics team for both Middle and Upper School, the Roboknights. The Middle School team participates in the FIRST Lego League, while the Upper School team participates in the FIRST Tech Challenge.

The school's Isdell Center for Global Leadership runs global education programs.

Sports programs

The baseball team won the Georgia Class A State Championship from 1993 to 1995, all of which included future Major League Baseball player Michael Barrett.

The boys' soccer team won the final three Fall Soccer League championships (2002 to 2004), and finished second nationally in the final NSCAA (National Soccer Coaches of America) poll during the fall of 2003. In its first season in the GHSA Spring League in 2006, the team captured the Class AA/A State Championship and finished 19th nationally and 5th in Region II in the Final NSCAA poll.

In 2006, the school announced plans to add a football team, with varsity play scheduled to begin in 2009. For most of its existence, the school focused on its soccer and baseball programs, opting to take part in a smaller fall soccer season to allow players to play baseball in the spring. However, the cancellation of the fall soccer season left the spring season the only option, leading the school to develop a football program.

The middle school football team reached the championships of the Atlanta Metro Football League in its first year in existence.

In fall 2010, after a 9-1 regular season, the Pace Knights football team made its first GHSA playoff appearance.

On November 9, 2013, the varsity girls' cross country team brought home a class 1A state championship title.

In December 2015 the Pace Academy Knights won the GHSA AA state championship, defeating Fitzgerald at the Georgia Dome, 42–21. The Knights were the 4th seed in region 6-AA, and played four away games and then the state championship in the Dome. The Knights went 13–2, avenging one of their losses in the state semifinals versus Greater Atlanta Christian School in a 45–20 blowout.

Notable alumni 
 Jamaree Salyer (2018), LA Chargers
 Michael Barrett (1995), major league baseball catcher
 Wendell Carter Jr. (2017), NBA basketball player
 Randy Harrison (1996), actor, Queer as Folk
 Deon Jackson (2017), NFL football player
 Clay Johnson (1995), technologist
 Sarah-Elizabeth Langford (1996), Miss America and Miss USA contestant
 Rich Middlemas (1993), documentary film producer, Undefeated
 Lydia Dean Pilcher (1976), film and television producer
 Tyler Prochnow (1984), team owner, sports agent, entrepreneur, Kansas City Command
 Kenny Selmon (2014), professional track and field athlete
 Sam Sloman (2016), NFL football player
 Andrew Thomas (2017), NFL football player
 Matt Towery (1978), columnist, author, political analyst, pollster and attorney

References

External links
 

Private K-12 schools in Atlanta
Preparatory schools in Georgia (U.S. state)
1958 establishments in Georgia (U.S. state)
Educational institutions established in 1958